Mao Weitao (born 8 August 1962) is a Chinese Yue opera actress-singer who usually portrays Sheng roles (i.e. male characters). A founding member of the acclaimed Zhejiang Xiaobaihua Yue Opera Troupe who also served as its president from 1999 to 2018, Mao Weitao is a household name among Yue opera listeners. For non-opera listeners, she is best known for her portrayal of Dongfang Bubai in the 2001 TV series Laughing in the Wind.

Mao Weitao is one of only 4 people who have won the Plum Blossom Grand Prize, given to those who continue to be active and innovative in theatre or opera after winning the Plum Blossom Prize twice. She is also the vice-chairperson of China Theatre Association. She was a member of the 7th, 8th, 9th, 10th, and 11th National People's Congress.

For years Mao Weitao has taken steps to "modernize" Yue opera. She has recently secured investment from billionaires Jack Ma and Song Weiping to realize some of her more ambitious plans regarding Yue opera.

Early life

Career
From 1999 to 2018 she has been the president of Zhejiang Xiaobaihua Yue Opera Troupe, with which she debuted in 1984.

Reform

Baiyue Cultural Creativity
In 2018, Mao Weitao quit her position in the Xiaobaihua Troupe to become chairwoman of Baiyue Cultural Creativity Co., which was registered in 2016 with the investment of Zhejiang billionaires Jack Ma and Song Weiping. The company seeks to provide services on theatre administration, play production, international collaboration, art education, theatre talent agency, as well as theatre investment, etc.

One of Baiyue's first projects was the construction of China Yue Theatre (中国越·剧场) in Hangzhou in 2018, whose state-of-art, butterfly-shaped complex was designed by C. Y. Lee.

Opera roles

References

Chinese television actresses
Chinese film actresses
Yue opera actresses
Singers from Zhejiang
People from Tongxiang
20th-century Chinese actresses
21st-century Chinese actresses
1962 births
Living people
20th-century Chinese women singers
21st-century Chinese women singers
Actresses from Jiaxing
Musicians from Jiaxing
People's Republic of China politicians from Zhejiang
Politicians from Jiaxing
Male impersonators in Yue opera